Espinasse may refer to:

 Espinasse, Cantal, France
 Espinasse, Puy-de-Dôme, France
 Espinasse-Vozelle, France
 Francis Espinasse (1823–1912), Scottish journalist
 Isaac Espinasse, author of Espinasse's Reports

See also
Espinasses, Hautes-Alpes, France
Lespinasse (disambiguation)